A new age of Khmer films with Vichara Dany and Kong Som Eun as the common lead actors. 4 films on this list are in existence, 5 have been remade, and 11 have not yet been remade.

Highest-grossing
The ten highest-grossing films at the Cambodian Box Office in 1970:

1970

References

1970
1970 in Cambodia
Cambodian